Events from the year 1805 in France.

Incumbents
 Emperor – Napoleon I

Events
22 July - Battle of Cape Finisterre, British defeat of Franco-Spanish fleet.
8 October - Battle of Wertingen, French victory over Austrian forces, opening battle of the Ulm Campaign.
11 October - Battle of Haslach-Jungingen, French victory over Austrian forces.
14 October - Battle of Elchingen, French victory over Austria.
16–19 October - Battle of Ulm, decisive French victory culminating in the surrender of an entire Austrian army.
21 October - Battle of Trafalgar, decisive British victory over French and Spanish Navies.
23 October - On the early death of her husband, François, Madame Clicquot Ponsardin takes over his champagne house as Veuve Clicquot.
30 October - Battle of Caldiero, French victory over Austrian forces.
31 October - Sweden declares war on France.
3 November - Battle of Cape Ortegal, decisive British victory, the final action of the Trafalgar campaign.
5 November - Battle of Amstetten, French victory over forces of Austria and Russia.
11 November - Battle of Dürenstein, between French, Austrian and Russian forces had an inconclusive result.
16 November - Battle of Schöngrabern, French tactical victory.
2 December - Battle of Austerlitz, decisive French victory, effectively destroying the Third Coalition.
4 December - Truce signed between France and Austria.
26 December - Peace of Pressburg signed between France and Austria, as a consequence of the Austrian defeats by France.
31 December - The French Republican calendar is used for the last time, 8 days after being annulled by Napoleon with effect from 1 January 1806, the final official date being "9 Nivôse in Year XIV of the Revolution". This year also he has ordered his soldiers to be vaccinated.
Pernod Fils founded in Pontarlier, Franche-Comté, by Henri-Louis Pernod and starts the production of the anise-flavored liquor known as absinthe.

Births
15 January - Louise Bertin, composer (died 1877)
10 March - Auguste Joseph Alphonse Gratry, author and theologian (died 1872)
29 May - Paul-Martin Gallocher de Lagalisserie, engineer (died 1871)
3 June - Adolphe Dugléré, chef (died 1884)
13 June - Bénilde Romançon, saint (died 1862)
19 June - Mathieu-Richard-Auguste Henrion, magistrate, historian and journalist (died 1862)
28 June - Napoléon Coste, guitarist and composer (died 1883)
29 July - Alexis de Tocqueville, political thinker and historian (died 1859)
19 August - Jules Barthélemy-Saint-Hilaire, philosopher, journalist and statesman (died 1895)
24 August - Jean-Jacques Meyer, steam locomotive engineer (died 1877)
24 October - Jean-Baptiste Pallegoix, vicar apostolic of Eastern Siam (died 1862)
19 November - Ferdinand de Lesseps, developer of the Suez Canal (died 1894)
19 November - Édouard Drouyn de Lhuys, statesman and diplomat (died 1881)
16 December - Isidore Geoffroy Saint-Hilaire, zoologist (died 1861)
31 December - Marie d'Agoult, author, pen name Daniel Stern (died 1876)

Deaths
17 January - Abraham Hyacinthe Anquetil-Duperron, orientalist (born 1731)
23 January - Claude Chappe, inventor (born 1763)
4 March - Jean-Baptiste Greuze, painter (born 1725)
18 March - Étienne Eustache Bruix, sailor (born 1759)
19 June - Louis-Jean-François Lagrenée, painter (born 1724)
2 October - Georges René Le Peley de Pléville admiral and Naval Minister (born 1726)
8 November - François-Thomas-Marie de Baculard d'Arnaud, writer and dramatist (born 1718)
24 November - Jacques Antoine Marie de Cazalès, orator and politician (born 1758)
1 December - Joseph Bernard de Chabert, sailor, geographer and astronomer (born 1724)

Full date unknown 
 Gabrielle Gauchat, French memoir writer (born 1767)
 Pierre-François Hugues d'Hancarville, "baron" and art historian, in Italy (born 1719)

See also

References

1800s in France